Josip Radošević (born 3 April 1994) is a Croatian professional footballer who plays as a defensive midfielder for Danish Superliga club Brøndby IF.

Club career

Hajduk Split
Radošević started his career playing at youth level for his hometown club Hajduk Split. The talented midfielder was promoted to Hajduk's senior side in November 2011. On 23 November 2011, he made his debut for the first team in a 1–0 win over NK Zagreb in the quarter-finals of the 2011–12 Croatian Cup, aged 17 and 7 months. In the 2011–12 season, Radošević started featuring as a regular in Hajduk first eleven, after Mišo Krstičević, who had previously coached Radošević in Hajduk Split youth team, was appointed as the new manager. In the 2012–13 season he established himself as the key player in defensive tasks in Hajduk midfield, appearing in 17 domestic league games before being transferred to S.S.C. Napoli.

Napoli
On 29 January 2013, Radošević was signed by Serie A side Napoli for a fee of €2 million euros. He had signed a six-month loan deal at first as Croatia became a part of the EU so he would not register as a foreign player when he made the deal permanent in the summer of 2013. Hajduk received another €1 million euros when he completed his transfer. On 25 August 2013, he made his official debut for Napoli in the first round of the 2013–14 season against Bologna, coming on as a substitute for Gonzalo Higuaín in the 84th minute.

Rijeka (loan)
On 4 February 2015, Radošević was loaned to Rijeka until 31 December 2015. He scored his first goal for the club in a dramatic fashion, when he scored an equaliser in the fourth minute of stoppage time against Dinamo Zagreb on 4 April 2015.

Red Bull Salzburg
On 31 August 2016, the last day of summer transfer window, Radošević signed for Austrian giants Red Bull Salzburg as a free agent.

Return to Hajduk Split
Josip Radošević was announced as a new Hajduk player on 3 June 2017. He took the kit number 14, the same one he had four and a half years ago before he left for Napoli.

Brøndby
On 27 July 2018, it was announced that Radošević would join the Danish side Brøndby IF on a four-year contract for a fee of €800,000. He made his debut on 5 August in a 2–0 Danish Superliga win over FC Nordsjælland. Radošević made 37 appearances in his first season in Denmark, scoring two goals. During his first season he mostly appeared as a defensive midfielder, taking over the role from fan favourite Christian Nørgaard who had signed with Fiorentina before the start of the season.

In the following season, after Niels Frederiksen took over as head coach of Brøndby, Radošević continued as a starter on defensive midfield before suffering a shoulder injury in a 5–2 win over Randers FC on 27 October 2019.

He again started playing more regularly as a starter during the first half of the 2020–21 season. In the second half of the season, Radošević was an undisputed starter in midfield as Brøndby won their first Danish Superliga title in 16 years. He finished the season with 35 appearances and no goals.

Radošević tested positive for COVID-19 amid an outbreak in the Brøndby first team on 6 August 2021. This meant that he missed games against rivals Copenhagen and the UEFA Champions League first play-off tie against his former team Red Bull Salzburg. On 20 August, Radošević signed a new four-year contract with Brøndby, extending his existing deal until June 2025.

International career
Radošević was a part of the Croatian national under-17 team in the qualifications for the 2011 UEFA European Under-17 Football Championship, playing in all six group games. Although Croatia ended qualifications undefeated, in the elite round they finished runners-up in the group behind hosts Netherlands and failed to qualify. Overall, he gathered 35 appearances for the youth teams, scoring two goals. In August 2012, Radošević was called up to the national team by manager Igor Štimac for the 2014 FIFA World Cup qualification matches against Macedonia and Belgium as an alternative for the defensive midfielder Ognjen Vukojević. On 11 September 2012, Radošević made his full debut for the national side in a 1–1 draw against Belgium, making him the youngest player to debut in the history of the national team.

Career statistics

Club

Honours
Napoli
Coppa Italia: 2013–14
Supercoppa Italiana: 2014

Red Bull Salzburg
Austrian Bundesliga: 2016–17
Austrian Cup: 2016–17

Brøndby
 Danish Superliga: 2020–21

References

External links

Player profile at Sportnet.hr 

1994 births
Living people
Footballers from Split, Croatia
Association football midfielders
Croatian footballers
Croatia youth international footballers
Croatia under-21 international footballers
Croatia international footballers
HNK Hajduk Split players
S.S.C. Napoli players
HNK Rijeka players
SD Eibar footballers
FC Red Bull Salzburg players
Brøndby IF players
Croatian Football League players
Serie A players
La Liga players
Austrian Football Bundesliga players
Danish Superliga players
Croatian expatriate footballers
Expatriate footballers in Italy
Croatian expatriate sportspeople in Italy
Expatriate footballers in Spain
Croatian expatriate sportspeople in Spain
Expatriate footballers in Austria
Croatian expatriate sportspeople in Austria
Expatriate men's footballers in Denmark
Croatian expatriate sportspeople in Denmark